The Men's long jump F36-38 events for athletes with cerebral palsy was held at the 2004 Summer Paralympics in the Athens Olympic Stadium. It was won by Guo Wei, representing .

20 Sept. 2004, 17:00

References

M